Edward Mitchell Kennedy  was a Church of Ireland priest in Ireland during the nineteenth century.

Kennedy was educated at Trinity College, Dublin. He  was Prebendary of Stagonil in St Patrick's Cathedral from 1843 to 1846;  and then of Clonmethan from 1846.  He was Dean of Clonfert from 1850 until his death in 1864.

References

Deans of Clonfert
19th-century Irish Anglican priests
Alumni of Trinity College Dublin
1864 deaths